Evergestis aenealis is a species of moth in the family Crambidae. It is found in most of Europe, except Ireland, Great Britain, the Benelux, Portugal, Slovenia and Ukraine.

Adults are on wing from April to August in two generations per year.

The larvae feed on Brassicaceae species.

References

Moths described in 1775
Evergestinae
Moths of Europe
Taxa named by Michael Denis
Taxa named by Ignaz Schiffermüller